Zhong Wenjing (born 25 September 1990) is a Chinese professional Go player.

He won the 23rd CCTV Cup in 2011.

Promotion record

Career record
2006: 34 wins, 21 losses
2007: 32 wins, 15 losses
2008: 30 wins, 22 losses
2009: 26 wins, 19 losses
2010: 28 wins, 22 losses
2011: 18 wins, 9 losses

Titles and runners-up

References

1990 births
Living people
Chinese Go players
Sportspeople from Wuhan